Principal is a settlement in the northern part of the island of Santiago, Cape Verde. It is part of the municipality of São Miguel. The settlement consists of several localities along the river Ribeira Principal, including Chão de Horta, Hortelão, Jaqueitão and Mato Curral. In 2010 its population was 1,193. Hortelão is 4 km north of the summit of the Serra Malagueta and 7 km northwest of Calheta de São Miguel.

References

São Miguel, Cape Verde
Villages and settlements in Santiago, Cape Verde